Polyadenylate-binding protein 3 is a protein that in humans is encoded by the PABPC3 gene. PABPC3 is a member of a larger family of poly(A)-binding proteins in the human genome.

References

Further reading

External links 
 PDBe-KB provides an overview of all the structure information available in the PDB for Human Polyadenylate-binding protein 3 (PABPC3)